The canton of La Haute-Vallée de l'Aude (before 2015: canton of Quillan) is an administrative division of the Aude department, southern France. Its borders were modified at the French canton reorganisation which came into effect in March 2015. Its seat is in Quillan.

It consists of the following communes:
 
Antugnac
Arques
Artigues
Aunat
Axat
Belcaire
Belfort-sur-Rebenty
Belvianes-et-Cavirac
Belvis
Bessède-de-Sault
Le Bousquet
Bugarach
Cailla
Campagna-de-Sault
Campagne-sur-Aude
Camps-sur-l'Agly
Camurac
Cassaignes
Chalabre
Le Clat
Comus
Corbières
Coudons
Couiza
Counozouls
Courtauly
Coustaussa
Cubières-sur-Cinoble
Escouloubre
Espéraza
Espezel
La Fajolle
Fontanès-de-Sault
Fourtou
Galinagues
Gincla
Ginoles
Granès
Joucou
Luc-sur-Aude
Marsa
Mazuby
Mérial
Missègre
Montazels
Montfort-sur-Boulzane
Montjardin
Nébias
Niort-de-Sault
Peyrefitte-du-Razès
Peyrolles
Puilaurens
Puivert
Quillan
Quirbajou
Rennes-le-Château
Rennes-les-Bains
Rivel
Rodome
Roquefeuil
Roquefort-de-Sault
Roquetaillade-et-Conilhac
Saint-Benoît
Sainte-Colombe-sur-Guette
Sainte-Colombe-sur-l'Hers
Saint-Ferriol
Saint-Jean-de-Paracol
Saint-Julia-de-Bec
Saint-Just-et-le-Bézu
Saint-Louis-et-Parahou
Saint-Martin-Lys
Salvezines
La Serpent
Serres
Sonnac-sur-l'Hers
Sougraigne
Terroles
Tréziers
Val-de-Lambronne
Val-du-Faby
Valmigère
Villefort

References

Cantons of Aude